Peter Laszlo Peri (born László Weisz; 13 June 1899 – 19 January 1967) was an artist and sculptor.

Name changes
László Weisz was born on 13 June 1899 in Budapest, Hungary. His family Magyarized their family name to "Péri". When he moved to Germany and became involved in Constructivism, he was known as Laszlo Péri. After he moved to England, he adopted the name "Peter Peri". His grandson, an artist born in 1971, also has the name Peter Peri.

Career
Born in 1899, in Budapest into a large, proletarian Jewish family Peri became politicised at an early age. In 1919, he finished an apprenticeship as a bricklayer, and became a student at the workshops for proletariat fine arts in 1919. He was in contact with Lajos Kassák and the Activists. In 1917, he began his career as an actor at the MA Theater School, studying with János Mácsza. As part of a theatre company he went to Prague where he heard about the fall of the Republic of Councils. He studied architecture in 1919–20 in Budapest and Berlin. He lived for a short time in Paris in 1920, in the house of a socialist baker, before being forced to leave the country due to his political activities.

Peri moved to Vienna, then on to Berlin in 1921, where he created his first abstract geometric reliefs. In February 1922, he had the first of two joint exhibitions with Moholy-Nagy at Der Sturm Gallery, Berlin. In 1923, his portfolio containing twelve linocuts was published by Der Sturm Verlag with accompanying text by Alfréd Kemény. His contributions to constructivism at the time were to challenge the surface of the wall by producing irregularly shaped wall reliefs and to open up new planes, anticipating the shaped canvas created after 1945; the discovery of concrete as a potential sculptural medium, colouring it if necessary, and the appreciation of the hard contour as a visual device, as seen in his collages and linoprints. These could be used to create a visual medium hovering between the relief and architecture; whereas Moholy-Nagy's Glasarchitektur achieved this using paint and canvas, Péri used less conventional media.

At the Grosse Berliner Kunstausstellung in May 1923, between the contributions of Theo van Doesburg and El Lissitzky's ‘Proun Room’ he showed his three-piece x composition which, while it may also have been executed in paint on wood, had pretensions to be executed in concrete. Peri, joined the German Communist Party (KPD) in 1923. His 1924, constructivist design for a Lenin tribute for the German art exhibition in Moscow, marked the end of his investigations into the non-objective.

That same year Peri began to work for the Berlin municipal architectural office and was there from 1924 to 1928. Probably motivated by a vision to put his productivist values into action, but frustrated he quit the job in 1928. In 1928, he signed the manifesto and statutes of the Association of Revolutionary Visual Artists of Germany (Assoziation Revolutionärer Bildener Künstler Deutschlands) (ARBKD) (ASSO) which, like other new and militant Communist art organisations, called for a reinvigoration of the idea of "proletarian culture" and suitably positive images of working-class life and culture. He was also a member of Die Abstrakten (The Abstracts) and Rote Gruppe (Red Group). In 1929, he returned to representational painting and sculpture.

Peri immigrated to England in 1933, after his wife Mary Macnaghten, granddaughter of social reformer Charles Booth, was arrested in possession of Communist propaganda. In 1934, Peri contributed "several forceful works in coloured concrete" to the Artists’ International Association (AIA) exhibition The Social Scene. He made contact with John Heartfield. In England, he lived first in Ladbroke Grove, then in Hampstead; in 1938, he moved to a studio in Camden Town where he worked until 1966. While in Hampstead, Peri joined the recently founded English section of the Artists International (later to be known as Artists International Association), an association composed largely of commercial artists and designers whose declared intention was to mobilise "the international unity of artists against Imperialist War on the Soviet Union, Fascism and Colonial oppression".  In July 1938, he had a solo exhibition London Life in Concrete in an empty building at 36 Soho Square. In 1939, he became a British citizen and took the name "Peter Peri". In November 1948, he held a solo show Peri's People at the AIA Gallery. Late in the 1940s he did a series of commissions for the London County Council. His work was also part of the sculpture event in the art competition at the 1948 Summer Olympics. In 1951, Peri produced a sculptural group originally titled “Sunbathing group - Horizontal”, later known as The Sunbathers for the Festival of Britain. Commissions from Stuart Mason, Director of Education for Leicestershire included Two Children Calling A Dog, Scraptoft, c. 1956; Atom Boy, and Birstall, 1960.

When the Herbert Art Gallery & Museum opened in 1960, Peri was commissioned to "represent the life and activities [of Coventry] in modern terms and materials"; the work is known simply as The Coventry Sculpture.

Peri joined the Quaker faith and produced a small bronze sculpture of a Quaker Meeting, much loved by the students of Woodbrooke Study Centre, Birmingham, where it is now located.

Peter Peri died on 19 January 1967.

Major works after 1945
Source: Exhibition catalogue, 1967.
Ministry of information
1946 Displaced persons. Concrete.
London County Council. For Lambeth 
1948 Children Playing.
1949 Footballers.
1950 Following the Leader.
Festival of Britain 
1951 The Sunbathers horizontal-group.
Leicestershire 
1955 Oadby Primary School. Three coloured reliefs.
1956 Scraptoft South Primary School. Horizontal concrete group.
1956 Scraptoft North Primary School. Folk dancing, coloured concrete relief.
1956 Earl Shilton Grammar School. Three dimensional sculpture.
1957 Wigston Secondary Modern School. The Living Christ.
1957 Castle Donington Secondary Modern School.  The Boy with the Book and the Globe. Horizontal.
1958 Longslade Grammar School. The Mastery of Atom = Self-mastery. Horizontal.
1959 Loughborough College of Technology. Diagonal concrete sculpture.
1959 Hinckley College for further education.  Cut out concrete relief.
Warwickshire 
1957 Willenhall Primary School. Three dimensional sculpture.
1958 Coventry. St. Michael Primary School. Coloured concrete relief.
1965 Ernesford Grange Junior School, Coventry. Sculpture and relief. Polyester [There is a full page illustration of this work, with the sculptor alongside in the Exhibition catalogue referred to, on page 6. The figures represent a flautist and a singer.].
1959 Exeter University. Diagonal sculpture.
1961 Huddersfield High School for Girls. Horizontal sculpture and a relief.
1961 Scott Bader Commonwealth, Wollaston, Northamptonshire. The Man in Polyester. Horizontal.
1961 Forest Gate Methodist Church, London, E.7. The Preacher. Diagonal sculpture.
1963 East Ham, E.6. Kensington Youth Club. Diagonal sculpture.
1964 Long Eaton Secondary Modern. Three dimensional sculpture.

Works in permanent collections 

 Museum of Modern Art, New York
 Centre Pompidou, Paris
 Berardo Collection Museum, Lisbon
 Wilhelm Lehmbruck Museum, Duisburg 
 Kunstmuseum Bochum, Bochum
 Holocaust Museum, Tel Aviv 
 Museum für Angewandte Kunst, Cologne
 Museum de Grenoble, Grenoble
 Museum of Fine Arts, Budapest

1938 Tate Gallery. Bronze horse.
1960 The Coventry sculpture. Herbert Art Gallery and Museum, Coventry.
1947 Hungarian National Gallery. Budapest. Etchings.
1956 Museum of Tel Aviv. Etchings.
1950 British Museum. Gulliver's Travels. Etchings.
1964 British Museum. The Pilgrim's Progress. Etchings.
1965 U.S.A. Earlham College, Richmond, Indiana. The Pilgrim's Progress.
Derbyshire Education Committee.
Sculpture and The Pilgrim's Progress Etchings.
Leicestershire Education Committee. Sculptures.
Camden London Borough Council. Sculptures.
The Arts Council. Etching.

Exhibitions

1922 Moholy-Nagy / Peri Der Sturm, Berlin 
1923 Moholy-Nagy / Peri Der Sturm, Berlin
1924 Peri / Hilbersheimer / Nell Walden Der Sturm, Berlin
1931 Ernst Múzeum Budapest (with N. Ferenczy, L. Herman, K. Istokovics, M. Lehel). 
1933 Bloomsbury Galleries London 
1936 From Constructivism to Realism Foyle Art Gallery 
1937 Gordon Fraser's Gallery Cambridge 
1938 London Life in Concrete Soho Square, London 
1948 People by Peri A.I.A. Gallery, London 
1952 Sculpture in Relation to Architecture A.A. Bedford Square, London 
1953 Exhibition arranged by the Football Association sponsored by the Arts Council 
1958 Pilgrim's Progress St George's Gallery, London 
1960 Sculpture and Etchings Herbert Art Gallery and Museum, Coventry 
1961 Trades Union's Festival Exhibition, Bethnal Green 
1963 St Pancras Arts Festival 
1966 It's the People who Matter Lloyd's Gallery, Wimbledon 
1967 Avant-garde Osteuropa 1910–1930 Academy of Arts, Berlin 
1968 Peter Peri 1899–1967 Central Library Swiss Cottage, London
1970 Peri's People The Minories, Colchester
1973 Laszlo Peri. Werke 1920–1924 und das Problem des Shaped Canvas, Kölnischer Kunstverein, Cologne
1982 Laszlo Peri 1899–1967. Arbeiten in Beton, Neue Gesellschaft für Bildende Kunst, Berlin
1987 László Moholy-Nagy / Laszlo Peri, Graphisches Kabinett, Bremen
1999 László Péris konstruktivistische Werke 1920-1924, Museum of Fine Arts, Budapest
2008 Peter Peri Exhibition, Sam Scorer Gallery, Lincoln.

References

External links
https://www.instagram.com/laszlo_peri/?hl=en
http://uk.pinterest.com/emmanuelleperi/laszlo-peter-peri/
 Permanent online exhibition at Sam Scorer Gallery
 Chris Miller's "I Love Sculpture" website containing an illustration of Peri's sculpture "Sunbathing", with male and female figures horizontal to a wall, with an audience enjoying it. (Accessed 24 February 2008).
 Designing Britain article on the Festival of Britain
 Art for Social Spaces article on Schools
 VADS: Visual Arts Data Service <SEARCH> "Peri" – 

1899 births
1967 deaths
Jewish artists
Hungarian Jews
Hungarian sculptors
20th-century sculptors
English Quakers
20th-century Quakers
Jewish emigrants from Nazi Germany to the United Kingdom
Artists from Budapest
Olympic competitors in art competitions